Jangseungbaegi Station is a station on the Seoul Subway Line 7.

The station's relatively long name is taken from that of the neighborhood of the same name. The neighborhood's name, in turn, is derived from an abundance of Korean village guardians (jangseung), erected in the 18th century by King Jeongjo of the Joseon Dynasty.

Station layout

Metro stations in Dongjak District
Seoul Metropolitan Subway stations
Railway stations opened in 2000